Clay Greenfield Motorsports (formerly Alger Motorsports) was an American professional stock car racing team that competed part-time in the NASCAR Camping World Truck Series. The team was owned by Clay Greenfield, who drove in the team's No. 68 Toyota Tundra along with Billy Alger, Wayne Edwards, Blake Koch, and Scott Riggs.

History

The team debuted as Alger Motorsports, running a part-time schedule in the 2011 NASCAR Camping World Truck Series season. After failing to qualify at Daytona, the team debuted in the spring race at Texas.

In 2012, the team fielded two trucks, the No. 68 for Greenfield and the No. 86 for Scott Riggs and Blake Koch in a start and park effort.

In 2013, the team was renamed to Clay Greenfield Motorsports. The team started out strong by earning the fastest time at the Daytona International Raceway during practice. Greenfield's 2013 season was most memorable in the last chance qualifier at the Eldora Speedway when he put up a hard fight against Norm Benning to qualify for the race. The season concluded with six starts with a best finish of 13th. The next few seasons were based on a part-time effort whenever funding was available as starts have mainly been attempted at super speedways.

The team also fielded a part-time ARCA Racing Series team, the No. 70 Chevrolet SS, for team co-owner Billy Alger in 2015 and 2016. Sometime after this, Alger would leave the team, making Greenfield its sole owner.

Greenfield's team intended on running 8 races in 2020, which was nearly the full schedule excluding Las Vegas, Daytona RC and Phoenix. Also that year, they hired NASCAR on Fox studio commentator Jeff Hammond to come out of retirement and crew chief the truck in its part-time schedule of races. However, the team ended up running nearly the full season, which was due to the fact that after the two month break in the season due to COVID-19, the field size for the series was expanded from 32 to 40 trucks due to the absence of qualifying. Bobby Reuse was also scheduled for the 68 at Daytona RC with a partnership with Jordan Anderson Racing, but failed to do so due to the chassis not properly admitted.

For 2021, Greenfield announced that his team would run the full season in the Truck Series for the first time. However, Greenfield himself will only run three races, while the team seeks funded drivers who bring sponsorship to run the remaining 19 after the team's primary sponsor Rackley Roofing entered a partnership with Willie Allen to form Rackley WAR.

References

External links
 

NASCAR teams